Jessica Ann Rickert became the first female American Indian dentist in America upon graduating with a DDS from the University of Michigan School of Dentistry in 1975. She was one of only six women in a class of 140 students. She is a member of the Prairie Band Potawatomi Nation, and a direct descendant of the Indian chief Wahbememe (Whitepigeon).

Early life and education 
Rickert grew up in Wyoming, Michigan. She graduated high school in 1968 and attended the University of Michigan for her undergraduate degree.

Career 
In addition to being a dentist, she is also a founder of the Society of American Indian Dentists, which was founded in 1990.

Honors 
She was inducted into the Michigan Women's Hall of Fame in 2009.

In 2022, she received the American Dental Education Association’s William J. Gies Award for Achievement.

References 

Native American people from Michigan
People from Wyoming, Michigan
American dentists
American dentistry academics
Women dentists
Native American health
University of Michigan alumni
20th-century Native American women
20th-century Native Americans
21st-century Native American women
21st-century Native Americans
Living people
Year of birth missing (living people)
Prairie Band Potawatomi Nation people